Adhi Annamalai is a suburb of Thiruvannaamalai and selection grade town Panchayat in Thiruvannamalai Taluk.

Demographics
It has the population of 21,901 according to a 2010 census, which is 9.4% higher than the 2001 population.

Landmark 
Adi Annamalai or Adhi Annamalai temple also known as Ani Annamalai  is situated in Thiruvannamalai. It is one of the shrines of the Vaippu Sthalams. It is found in the girivalam of Tiruvannamalai temple. It is found in the girivalam route of Arunachalesvara Temple.

References

External links
 Muvar Thevara Vaippu Thalangal, மூவர் தேவார வைப்புத்தலங்கள்,  aNiaNNAmalai, Sl.No.4 of 139 temples
 Shiva Temples, தேவார வைப்புத்தலங்கள், அணி அண்ணாமலை, Sl.No.4 of 133 temples, page1

See also
 Adi Annamalaiyar Temple, Adi Annamalai

Cities and towns in Tiruvannamalai district
Hindu temples in Tiruvannamalai district